"Lifening" is a song by Northern Irish alternative rock group Snow Patrol.  The track is the fifth single from the band's sixth studio album, Fallen Empires. It was released as a free digital download on 3 July 2012 from the band's official website.

Background and writing
In various interviews, Lightbody has stated that the song "Lifening" was written after his sister had children. He stated that he felt "his body clock" telling him that it was time to have children himself, and he has stated that the song is his way of trying to work out what he actually wants from life.

Promotion
The single version of the song, Jacknife Lee's "Burst to Life Mix", received its worldwide first play on Radio 1's Review Show with Edith Bowman on 3 July 2012. Lightbody had originally stated that he thought the song would have a "soft" release.

Music video
According to Lightbody's blog, the video for "Lifening" was filmed live during the band's live set at Chicago, as the song "has become a real live moment over the course of this year and we wanted to capture it".

Track listing

Charts

References

2012 singles
Snow Patrol songs
Songs written by Gary Lightbody
Song recordings produced by Jacknife Lee
Songs written by Jacknife Lee
2011 songs
Polydor Records singles